The Lakeland School System (LSS) is a municipal school district serving the city of Lakeland, Tennessee, United States, within Greater Memphis. Lakeland Elementary School and Lakeland Preperatory School are within the district.

In December 2013 the district selected as its superintendent Dr. Ted Horrell, the principal of Germantown High School, and a former principal of Millington Central High School.

As of January 2014 the school district established a survey on Surveymonkey to gauge parental attitudes on several issues. As of that year, the residents are served by Shelby County Schools with elementary students attending Lakeland Elementary School and more than 1,200 students from Lakeland in higher grades attending campuses in Arlington and Bartlett.

Attempted Bolton Annexation 
In early 2014, some residents of the Bolton community sought annexation with Lakeland, partly so the unincorporated area could join a municipal school district. Bolton includes Barret's Chapel Elementary School and Bolton High School. The vote for annexation went before the Lakeland City Board on June 12, 2014 and failed. One resident of the community told the Board that "10 times more residents have petitioned you not to annex than have petitioned you to annex."

Schools
Lakeland Elementary, opened in 2001 as a school within Shelby County Schools, with its founding principal Mrs. Nancy Rouse. It has a capacity of 1,000 students. The school has grades K-4 attending the school currently, with its current principal Ms. Joretha Lockhart. The school used to have fifth-grade classes attending the school, but that changed in 2017 due to the opening of Lakeland Preperatory School.

Lakeland Preparatory School (formerly known as "Lakeland Middle Preperatory School"), opened in the Fall of 2017 under the leadership of its first principal, Mr. Matt Adler. The school has grade-five through nine classes attending the school currently, with its current principal Ms. Corrie Martin and vice princpal Ms. Jeana Decker. For now, grades 10-12 go to Arlington High School through an inter-local agreement with Arlington Community Schools.

References

External links
 Lakeland School System
 "Schools in Transition." The Commercial Appeal.

School districts in Shelby County, Tennessee
School districts established in 2014